The James Wilhoite House is a historic Italianate style house in Allisona, Tennessee, United States, that was listed on the National Register of Historic Places in 1988. The property is also known as the Reed Corlette House.

It includes Italianate architecture.

According to a 1988 study of Williamson County historical resources, it is one of a handful of notable, historic Italianate style residences in the county, others being the John Hunter House, the Andrew Vaughn House, the Owen-Cox House, the Y.M. Rizer House (c. 1875, a combination of Italianate and Second Empire design), the Henry Pointer House, the Jordan-Williams House, and the Thomas Critz House.

References

Houses completed in 1877
Houses in Williamson County, Tennessee
Houses on the National Register of Historic Places in Tennessee
Italianate architecture in Tennessee
National Register of Historic Places in Williamson County, Tennessee
1877 establishments in Tennessee